Thitarodes armoricanus is a species of moth of the family Hepialidae. It was described by Charles Oberthür in 1909, and is known from the Tibet Autonomous Region, in China.

References

External links
Hepialidae genera

Moths described in 1909
Hepialidae